This is a list of members of the Tasmanian House of Assembly, elected at the 1996 state election:

 ALP member Michael Field resigned in early 1997. Mike Gard was elected as his replacement on 15 July.
 Liberal member Roger Groom resigned in early 1997. Carole Cains was elected as his replacement on 15 July.

Distribution of seats

Members of Tasmanian parliaments by term
20th-century Australian politicians